The 1997 Webby Awards were the first of the annual Webby Awards, and also the first-ever nationally televised awards ceremony devoted to the Internet.  700 people attended the event on March 6, 1997, at Bimbo's Night Club in San Francisco, California.

Nominees and winners
(from http://www.webbyawards.com/webbys/winners-1997.php)

Panelists
Whereas in later years the panelists were official members of International Academy of Digital Arts and Sciences, in 1997 the awards were chosen and given by IDG's The Web Magazine, which appointed a panel to judge the competition.

The panel of judges was:
{| class="wikitable"
|Dean Andrews
|Contributing writer, The Web Magazine|-
|Spencer Ante
|Associate editor, The Web Magazine|-
|Justine Bateman
|Star, Men Behaving Badly|-
|Alex Bennett
|Radio host
|-
|Jane Bosveld
|Contributing writer, The Web Magazine; former editor at Ms, Omni, NetGuide|-
|Lily Burana
|Former editor in chief, Future Sex; The Web Magazine regular columnist
|-
|Ted Casablanca
|E! Entertainment Television and E! Online gossip columnist
|-
|James Cury
|Senior Associate Editor, The Web Magazine|-
|The Eels
|Rock band, DreamWorks Records
|-
|Ira Flatow
|Executive Producer/Host, National Public Radio Science|-
|Steve Fox
|Editor-in-Chief, The Web Magazine|-
|Angela Freeman
|PC World Assistant Editor
|-
|Kurt Freytag
|President, Lucid Dreams|-
|David Futrelle
|Editor, Salon|-
|Lisa Goldman
|President, Construct Internet Design|-
|Michael Goodwin
|Movie critic, computer journalist
|-
|Michael Gough
|Editor in Chief, Sidewalk.com|-
|Nina Hartley
|Actress
|-
|Ean Hauts
|Computer journalist
|-
|Glen Helfand
|Freelance writer
|-
|Eric Hellweg
|Contributing writer, The Web Magazine; Staff Editor, PC World|-
|Marjorie Ingall
|Freelance writer
|-
|Penn Jillette
|Magician, performer
|-
|Amy Johns
|Editor, Wired|-
|Pagan Kennedy
|Contributing Editor, The Web Magazine; author
|-
|Todd Lappin
|Cyberrights Editor, Wired|-
|Rob Levine
|Music critic; contributing editor, The Web Magazine|-
|Karen Libertore
|Online Producer, MacWorld Online|-
|Jennife McDonald
|Literary Agent
|-
|Mark Meadows
|Creative Director, Construct Internet Design|-
|Pamela Mendels
|Reporter, The New York Times CyberTimes|-
|Sia Michel
|Contributing editor, The Web Magazine; associate editor, Spin|-
|Erika Milvy
|Freelance writer
|-
|Lisa Palac
|Founding Editor of Future Sex|-
|Tony Perkin
|Editor-in-Chief, Red Herring|-
|David Pescovitz
|Author, Editor
|-
|Adam Philips
|Contributing Editor, The Web Magazine|-
|Suzan Revah
|Contributing editor, The Web Magazine; associate editor, American Journalism Review|-
|Derk Richardson
|Music, TV, and Film Critic
|-
|Henry Rosenthal
|Film Producer
|-
|Bob Sabat
|Managing Editor, SmartMoney|-
|Nathan Schedroff
|Creative Director, VIVID Studios|-
|Leonard Shlain
|Surgeon, Author
|-
|RU Sirius
|Author; Cofounder of Mondo 2000|-
|Howard Smukler
|Attorney
|-
|J. Michael Straczynski
|Creator and Producer of Babylon 5|-
|Jennifer Sucov
|Senior Editor, Folio|-
|Eric Tyson
|Contributing Editor, The Web Magazine; Syndicated columnist; Author
|-
|Laura Victoria
|The Web Magazine Sex section Writer
|-
|Brad Wieners
|Editor, HardWired|-
|Bernie Yee
|Author
|-
|Zak Zaidman
|Founder, Gravity, Inc.|}

ReferencesWinners and nominees are generally named according to the organization or website winning the award, although the recipient is, technically, the web design firm or internal department that created the winning site and in the case of corporate websites, the designer's client.  Web links are provided for informational purposes, both in the most recently available archive.org version before the awards ceremony and, where available, the current website.  Many older websites no longer exist, are redirected, or have been substantially redesigned.''

External links
Official website

1997 awards in the United States
1997
1997 in San Francisco
Culture of San Francisco
Russian Hill, San Francisco
March 1997 events in the United States